Brechites is a genus of bivalves belonging to the family Penicillidae.

The species of this genus are found in Red Sea, Malesia and Australia.

Species:

Brechites attrahens 
Brechites australis 
Brechites nagahamai

References

Anomalodesmata
Bivalve genera